Rachael Lily Rosenbloom (And Don't You Ever Forget It) is a musical with a book by Paul Jabara and Tom Eyen, music by Jabara, and lyrics by Jabara, David Debin, and Paul Issa.

The convoluted plot revolves around the misadventures of the title character (whose first name sports the extra "a" dropped by Barbra Streisand from her own) and her journey from a Brooklyn fish market to fame as a Hollywood gossip columnist, and then a career culminating in an Academy Award nomination and a nervous breakdown. The score is a mix of disco and typical Broadway show tunes.

Jabara had written the show specifically for Bette Midler, who passed on the project. Eyen was brought in to overhaul the book and replace original director Ron Link, and Grover Dale was hired to assist Tony Stevens with the choreography.

The Broadway production began previews on November 26, 1973. Within days, it was obvious to everyone involved that it was beyond repair. On December 1, a small notice in the local newspapers announced the show would be closing that night, prior to its official opening.

The demand for tickets was immediate. Theatre buffs who revel in the calamitous as much as the classical were determined to see what was destined to go down in the Broadway annals as one of the all-time biggest flops. When the curtain went up that night, the cast was facing a sold-out house. Frank Rich of the New York Times noted that the musical had a small hardcore group of fans who had followed its evolution from the beginning and already had seen it several times: "In scattered pockets throughout the otherwise shell-shocked house were claques of theatergoers who sang along with the musical numbers and gave mini-standing ovations at the end of most of them." 

Producers Robert Stigwood and Ahmet Ertegün lost all of their $500,000 investment in the production. In addition to Ellen Greene in the title role, the cast included Jabara, Wayne Cilento, Anita Morris, Thommie Walsh, and André DeShields.

The play was mentioned in passing in the liner notes of Paul Jabara's The Third Album.

In January 2017, Feinstein's/54 Below announced it would revive the musical, with the support of Jabara's family, for two concert stagings on March 13, 2017.

Musical numbers
Playbill lists performer's name instead of character's name.     

Act I
Scene 1: The 46th Annual Academy Awards Presentation      
 "Academy Awards Theme" - Company
Scene 2: Brooklyn Garbage Cans
 "Dear Miss Streisand" - Ellen
Scene 3: Fulton Fish Market     
 "Delivery Boys' Lament" - Richard, Kenneth, Andre, Thomas, Anthony    
 "Me and My Perch" - Ellen, Richard, Kenneth, Andre, Thomas, Anthony
Scene 4: Rachael's Brooklyn Bedroom
 "Gorgeous Lily" - Ellen, Paul, Michon, Carole      
 "Get Your Show Rolling" - Marion, Ellen, Andre, Anthony, Company
Scene 5: The Rachael Rosenbloom Radio Show     
 "Hollywood! Hollywood!" - Marion, Ellen, Paul, Andre, Anthony
Scene 6: Traveling Cross Country
 "East Brooklyn Blues" - Ken, Richard, Ellen, Judy, Michon, Carole, Andre, Jozella, Company
Scene 7: Hollywood's Own Lolo Lounge      
 "Broadway Rhythm" - Anita, Girls      
 "Hollywood is Dying" - Boys
 "Broadway I Love You" - Anita
Scene 8: A Park Near Beverly Hills     
 "Raymond's Song" - Paul, Ellen      
 "Seduction Samba" - Marion, Andre, Anthony, Company      
 "Rona, Mona and Me" - Paul, Carole, Jane
Scene 9: Stella's Bathroom      
 "Working for Stella" - Anita, Ellen      
 "Silver Diamond Rhinestone Glasses" - Ellen
Scene 10: Stella's Southern California Party      
 "Party Sickness" - Company      
 "Take Me Savage" - Anita, Judy, Jozella      
 "Overdose" - Company      
 "Get Your Show Rolling (Reprise)" - Marion, Ellen, Full Company     

Act II      
Scene 1: The 46th Annual Academy Awards Presentation
 "Academy Awards Theme" - Company
Scene 2: Rachael's Hollywood Bedroom

Scene 3: Barbra's Reception Room

Scene 4: Rachael's Hollywood Bedroom      
 "Change in Raquel" - Ellen, Paul, Richard, Kenneth, Anthony, Andre      
 "Raquel Gives the Dish" - Ellen, Anthony, Michon, Kenneth, Thomas, Andre, Richard
 "Gorgeous Lily (Reprise)" - Ellen, Paul
Scene 5: Ocho Rios
 "Ochos Rios" - Ellen, Andre, Anita, Paul, Thomas, Company
Scene 6: Sam Dago's Bar
Scene 7: On Location in the Depths Of North Africa
 "Cobra Woman" - Ellen, Company
Scene 8: Sam Dago's Bar     
 "Things" - Ellen, Kenneth, Thomas, Richard, Anthony      
 "One Man" - Ellen, Anita, Marion, Girls
Scene 9: In the Gutter Outside Sam Dago's

Scene 10: Fulton Fish Market

Scene 11: In the Streets     
 "We'll Be There" - Marion, Andre, Anthony, Jozella, Judy
 "One Man (Reprise)" - Anita, Marion
Scene 12: The Rachael Lily Rosenbloom Concert     
 "Broadway Rhythm (Reprise)" - Full Company      
 "We'll Be There (Reprise)" - Full Company

References
Not Since Carrie: Forty Years of Broadway Musical Flops by Ken Mandelbaum, published by St. Martin's Press (1991), pages 29–31

External links
Internet Broadway Database listing
On the Particular Pleasure of Seeing a Broadway Flop by Frank Rich, New York Times, March 20, 1983

1973 musicals
Broadway musicals